Group A was one of two groups of the 2018 IIHF World Championship. The four best placed teams advanced to the playoff round, while the last placed team is relegated to Division I in 2019.

Standings

Matches
All times are local (UTC+2).

Russia vs France

Sweden vs Belarus

Switzerland vs Austria

France vs Belarus

Czech Republic vs Slovakia

Austria vs Russia

Sweden vs Czech Republic

Slovakia vs Switzerland

Belarus vs Russia

Sweden vs France

Austria vs Slovakia

Czech Republic vs Switzerland

Switzerland vs Belarus

Sweden vs Austria

Slovakia vs France

Czech Republic vs Russia

France vs Austria

Belarus vs Czech Republic

Slovakia vs Sweden

Austria vs Belarus

Russia vs Switzerland

France vs Czech Republic

Switzerland vs Sweden

Russia vs Slovakia

Czech Republic vs Austria

Switzerland vs France

Belarus vs Slovakia

Russia vs Sweden

References

External links
Official website

A